Neoneli is a comune (municipality) in the Province of Oristano in the Italian region Sardinia, located about  north of Cagliari and about  northeast of Oristano.

Neoneli borders the following municipalities: Ardauli, Austis, Nughedu Santa Vittoria, Ortueri, Sorgono, and Ula Tirso.

References

Cities and towns in Sardinia